Richard Sidney Mulhern (born March 1, 1955) is a Canadian retired ice hockey defenceman. Mulhern was born in Edmonton, Alberta and raised in Beaconsfield, Quebec.

Before playing in the NHL, he played for the Sherbrooke Castors. Also, around the end of his career he played with the Tulsa Oilers and Dallas Black Hawks, of the Central Hockey League.

Mulhern started his National Hockey League career with the Atlanta Flames in 1975, after being picked eighth overall in the 1975 Amateur Draft and being first sent to Tulsa  where he played 56 games during the 1975-76 season.

He also played for the Toronto Maple Leafs, Los Angeles Kings, and Winnipeg Jets. He retired after the 1981 season, due to declining play, which came from back injuries and surgery.

In his career, he played in 303 NHL games. He scored 27 goals.

Career statistics

External links

1955 births
Atlanta Flames draft picks
Atlanta Flames players
Canadian ice hockey defencemen
Houston Aeros draft picks
Ice hockey people from Quebec
Living people
Los Angeles Kings players
National Hockey League first-round draft picks
People from Beaconsfield, Quebec
Ice hockey people from Edmonton
Toronto Maple Leafs players
Winnipeg Jets (1979–1996) players
World Hockey Association first round draft picks